Fred Anderson (born 9 June 1931) is a former Australian rules footballer who played with Fitzroy in the Victorian Football League (VFL).

Anderson, a rover from Ivanhoe Amateurs, played three seasons for Fitzroy.

From Fitzroy, he made his way to Hawthorn but would not play a senior league game for his new club.

He was cleared to Greensborough in 1955 and captain-coached them to that season's Diamond Valley Football League premiership.

References

External links

1931 births
Australian rules footballers from Victoria (Australia)
Fitzroy Football Club players
Ivanhoe Amateurs Football Club players
Greensborough Football Club players
Greensborough Football Club coaches
Living people